Gerhard Dietmar Eberhard Weiß (also spelled Weiss; 8 January 1960, in Lübz – 17 February 2018, in Kloster Lehnin) was an East German javelin thrower.

Weiß represented the sports club SC Traktor Schwerin, and became East German champion in 1981. His personal best throw was 83.30 metres, achieved in June 1988 in Jena.

Achievements

References

External links
 
 
 
 

1960 births
2018 deaths
People from Lübz
People from Bezirk Schwerin
East German male javelin throwers
Sportspeople from Mecklenburg-Western Pomerania
Olympic athletes of East Germany
Athletes (track and field) at the 1988 Summer Olympics
Universiade medalists in athletics (track and field)
Universiade silver medalists for East Germany
Medalists at the 1981 Summer Universiade